The College of Engineering and Information Technology is one of three colleges at the University of Maryland, Baltimore County. The college offers bachelor's, master's, and doctoral degrees in various engineering, computer science, and information systems programs for full and part-time students. The programs featured in the College of Engineering and Information Technology are ranked for top enrollments and degrees in several areas.

History
The College of Engineering and Information Technology was first established as an extension of the A. James Clark School of Engineering of the University of Maryland, College Park up until 1988 when the organization of the University System of Maryland was formed, giving autonomy to the University of Maryland, Baltimore County.

Departments
 Chemical, Biochemical & Environmental Engineering
 Computer Science and Electrical Engineering
 Information Systems
 Mechanical Engineering

Centers
 Center for Accelerated Real Time Analytics
 Center for Advanced Studies in Photonics Research
 Center for Advanced Sensor Technology
 Center for Cybersecurity
 Center for Urban Environmental Research & Education
 Center for Information Security and Assurance
 Center for Women In Technology

References

External links
Official website
Departmental Directory

College of Engineering and Information Technology
Engineering universities and colleges in Maryland
Maryland, Baltimore County
Maryland, Baltimore County
College of Engineering and Information Technology
Engineering and Information Technology